Guido Willy (Guy) Swennen (born 1956) is a Belgian politician and a member of the Socialistische Partij Anders. He was co-opted as a member of the Belgian Senate in 2007.

Notes

Living people
Socialistische Partij Anders politicians
Members of the Belgian Federal Parliament
1956 births
21st-century Belgian politicians